Lalla Salma (born Salma Bennani, 10 May 1978) is the princess consort of Morocco. She is married to King Mohammed VI, and the first wife of a Moroccan ruler to have been publicly acknowledged and given a royal title. Since she has not been seen in an official capacity since December 2017, there have been speculations in the media that the couple are divorced.

Early life and education
She was born as Salma Bennani in Fez. Her father is Hadj Abdelhamid Bennani, a university teacher who taught at l'École normale supérieure de Fès and her mother is Naïma Bensouda, who died in 1981 when Salma was three years old. From then on, she and her sister Meryem were raised by her maternal grandmother, Hajja Fatma Abdellaoui Maâne. She lived in Rabat, with her half cousin Saira, and the two are commonly seen together in public.

She was educated in Rabat, where she attended a private school, Lycée Hassan II, Lycée Moulay Youssef, and l'École Nationale Supérieure d'Informatique et d'Analyse de Systèmes. She met her husband during a private party in 1999. After completing her engineering studies, she worked for a few months as an information services engineer at ONA Group, the country's largest private holding company (which is also controlled by the Moroccan Royal Family).

Marriage and children
Lalla Salma became engaged to King Mohammed VI on 12 October 2001. Their first wedding ceremony, the sadaq ceremony (or proclamation of marriage) took place on 20 March 2002; and the zafaf (or celebration of marriage) took place on 12 and 13 July 2002 at Dar al-Makhzen (the principal Royal palace) in Rabat.

Issue

Activities
Lalla Salma has kept quite a low profile as Princess of Morocco, although a more public one than her predecessors. She supports cancer associations and the Fez Sacred Music Festival.

Lalla Salma has represented the King and Morocco in meetings and gatherings in Saudi Arabia, Japan, Thailand, Palestine, Tunisia and France.  On 29 April 2011, she attended the wedding of Prince William, Duke of Cambridge and Catherine Middleton. She also attended the wedding of Guillaume, Hereditary Grand Duke of Luxembourg, and Countess Stéphanie de Lannoy in 2012 and 2013 inauguration of King Willem-Alexander.

In 2005, Lalla Salma founded a cancer prevention association in Morocco. She created the Lalla Salma Foundation – Prevention and Treatment of Cancer and has also been involved in HIV/AIDS prevention in Africa. In 2006, Princess Lalla Salma was named a Goodwill Ambassador of the World Health Organization for the Cancer Care, Promotion and Prevention. Besides being involved in cancer and HIV/AIDS prevention, she also supports and encourages women's empowerment.

Honours
 Grand Cross of the Order of Isabella the Catholic of Spain (14 January 2005).
 Grand Cross of the National Order of Merit of Senegal (1 December 2008).
 Gold Medal of the World Health Organization (25 May 2017).

References

External links

21st-century women engineers
1978 births
Dames Grand Cross of the Order of Isabella the Catholic
Living people
Salma
Moroccan princesses
People from Fez, Morocco
Princesses by marriage
Recipients of the Grand Cross of the Order of Leopold II
20th-century Moroccan women
21st-century Moroccan women